Erythrolamprus breviceps, the short ground snake, is a species of snake in the family Colubridae. The species is found in Suriname, Brazil, Ecuador, Colombia, Bolivia, Peru, French Guiana, and Guyana.

References

Erythrolamprus
Reptiles of Bolivia
Reptiles of Peru
Reptiles described in 1860
Taxa named by Edward Drinker Cope